Warhammer 40,000: Inquisitor – Martyr is an action role-playing video game developed and published by NeocoreGames for Microsoft Windows on June 5, 2018, for the PlayStation 4 and Xbox One on August 23, 2018, and for PlayStation 5 and Xbox Series X/S on October 27, 2022. It takes place in the setting for the wargaming franchise Warhammer 40,000 created by Games Workshop.

Gameplay 

The gameplay uses a top-down camera and focuses heavily on action, both melee and ranged, it has a leveling system and different playable character classes. Based on this, the game has been frequently compared to Diablo. The game uses a cover system for both the players and enemies, and features destructible environments. The game can be played both solo and in co-op.

There are four playable classes in this game: the Psyker has powerful area-attack and debuff spells; the Crusader is slow but heavily armored; the Assassin is fast and deadly but lightly-armored; and the Tech-Adept (expansion only) summons robotic minions to fight alongside him.

Plot

Setting and characters
The game takes place in the fictional universe of Warhammer 40,000.  The player character is a member of the Inquisition, a secret police force tasked with fighting Chaos worship and alien influence in the Imperium. The game takes place in the Caligari Sector, which was created by NeocoreGames specifically for this game.

Martyr (original game)
The game begins with the discovery of an abandoned battleship  seemingly appearing out of nowhere in the Caligari Sector. The leading body of the sector, the Caligari Conclave, makes contact with the titular Inquisitor and requests they investigate the ghost ship. Teleportation is impossible due to a jamming signal emanating from the ship so the Inquisitor boards a transport and heads to the colossus. Upon arrival, the Inquisitor's transport is shot down by the ghost ship's automated defenses, which forces the Inquisitor to crash land on the hangar deck. The initial investigation of the ghost ship reveals that it is the Martyr, a Fortress Monastery that disappeared 5,000 years ago and was commanded by Lord Inquisitor Uther Tiberius. Further investigation implies that Uther Tiberius may have been the head of a cult dedicated to the worship of Nurgle, a daemonic entity from the otherworldly dimension known as the Warp. Proceeding deeper into the ship, the Inquisitor comes across an Adeptus Astartes from the Stormwatcher Chapter called Caius Thorn. Thorn informs the Inquisitor that he is led by Lord Inquisitor Klosterheim and that his expedition arrived shortly after the Martyr reappeared; however, the expedition became stranded after the Martyr activated a jamming signal to prevent them from gaining access to the lower decks. After Thorn and the Inquisitor disable the jamming signal, Thorn is seriously hurt in combat and the warp drives on the Martyr suddenly activate. As warp travel could be potentially fatal, the Inquisitor contacts his ship's captain (Captain Ragna Van Wynter) in order to teleport away with the critically injured Thorn. As the Martyr disappears into the Warp, the Inquisitor pledges to save Thorn in order to learn how to track down the Martyr.

The Inquisitor travels to the Merciful Agony Void Station in search of a Magos Biologis that can revive Thorn; however, the station Genetor in charge tells the Inquisitor that the person he seeks, Metrodora Thelema, is on priority assignment studying a chaos epidemic on the Saint Abelard Research Station. After purging the chaos from the station, the Inquisitor must travel to three different locations in search of Thelema and the source of the epidemic. Eventually finding her amidst the threat of chaos daemons and rogue heretical Imperials, Thelema joins the Inquisitor's retinue. Once Thorn is revived from stasis, he informs the Inquisitor that while he does not know where the Martyr is located, he does know how Klosterheim found it in the first place: a sect of Adeptus Mechanicus Tech-priests located on Kardian II whose sole goal is researching and locating the relics of Uther Tiberius. Upon arrival, the Inquisitor finds that Kardian II is under attack by a rogue group of Imperial Guard known as the Feral Beasts and have either killed or captured all of the Tech-priests. Breaking through the siege, the Inquisitor finds and rescues Artificer Omicron Arkh of the Requisitional Expedition Epsilon-26 who informs the Inquisitor that they can locate Klosterheim through the use of a relic known as Uther's Tarot. After securing the relic and having Omicron Arkh join the Inquisitor's retinue, the Inquisitor uses Uther's Tarot to locate the Martyr and Klosterheim.

Upon arriving back on the Martyr, the Inquisitor makes his way through the chaos forces still present on the ship to find and confront Klosterheim. Along the way, the Inquisitor begins having strange visions of the Martyr and Klosterheim talking to an unknown person about finding the secrets of Uther Tiberius. Upon confronting Klosterheim, it is revealed that the Inquisitor is Klosterheim's former superior who gave him orders to secure the Martyr and locate Uther Tiberius' greatest secret: a being known as the Alpha Pariah. Klosterheim explains that the Inquisitor's previous actions to find the Martyr bordered on the heretical and these actions caught the attention of the Grey Knights, an Adeptus Astartes chapter dedicated to eradicating daemons and their agents. In order to protect the Alpha Pariah from the Grey Knights, the Inquisitor voluntarily wiped all of their memories and became a different person. When asked about the whereabouts of Uther and the Alpha Pariah, Klosterheim informed the Inquisitor that Uther's subject's rebelled against him as they believed his fervent desire to create the Alpha Pariah was too heretical. Uther was eventually slain, but not before the Alpha Pariah was secured and Uther's body spirited away by the captain of the Martyr: Gregor Van Wynter. In order to open the Stasis Chamber where the Alpha Pariah is kept, they must find Uther Tiberius' rosette; however, the rosette is also sought after by a heretical band of Adeptus Astartes known as the Word Bearers who have made their way onto the Martyr and are attempting to locate the Alpha Pariah for themselves.

The Inquisitor teleports onto their own ship and questions the captain on information of her Rogue Trader heritage. Captain Ragna says that after her family's house was purged for heresy during her father's reign, all of the secrets of her family's house were kept in an ancestral logbook on a ship called the Astute Cavalier. The Inquisitor finds the hideout of the remaining Van Wynters in order to find the Astute Cavalier only to discover that the remaining members have joined forces with the Word Bearers and sold them the ship to become a harbinger of doom. A former captain of the Van Wynter House, Nathaniel Grexus, remained loyal to the Imperium and held captive by the Word Bearers. Upon being rescued, Captain Grexus used his extensive contacts to locate the destination of the Astute Cavalier as the headquarters of the Word Bearers. Before it can arrive there, the Inquisitor intercepts the ship and fights their way through the Word Bearer legions to locate the Van Wynter logbook. Using the book, the Inquisitor learns that the captain of the Martyr took Uther's body to a sanctuary headed by a cult dedicated to following Uther's teachings; however, when the Inquisitor visits the sanctuary they are ambushed by an Inquisitorial kill-team led by Interrogator Koltar. Koltar informs the Inquisitor that a member of Uther's cult, Inquisitor Flavius Draken, took Uther's vestiges and hid them in an unknown location. Contacting the Caligari Conclave, the Inquisitor is informed that Flavius Draken is located on Nereus Prime attempting to stop its invasion by the Alpha Legion Chaos Marines. After breaking through the siege with the help of a Shadowsword Tank and a Freeblade Knight named Ambrose Caradoc, the Inquisitor confronts Draken who reveals that he hid Uther's vestiges in an Echlesiarchy cathedral located on a moon close to a Warpsurge.

Inside the cathedral, the Inquisitor finds a warband of the Black Legion intent on destroying the anchor machines keeping the moon in place. Guided by the lone monk still guarding the cathedral, Lucius Teilhardt, the Inquisitor locates Uther's rosette but is unable to save the anchor machines, dooming the moon to eventually be swallowed up by the Warpsurge. Upon arrival back to the Martyr, the Inquisitor finds it besets by yet more daemons reinforced by the dreaded Plague Marines. Battling through the legions, it is learned that the Plague Marines are attempting to destroy the Martyr's Empyrean Seals along with the Machine Spirit that controls the Martyr. It is revealed through investigation that Uther Tiberius made a pact with a Greater Daemon known as the Thing in the Walls, the Unclean One in order to artificially create the Alpha Pariah and use her attempt to rule the dimension known as the Warp. The Alpha Pariah is a unique holder of the Pariah Gene, where she not only is able to completely resist daemon possession and influence, but also completely destroy the essence of a daemon, making it unable to reform itself in the Warp. Knowing that such powerful abilities could be either the salvation or ruination of the Imperium of Man, Uther locked the Alpha Pariah away in the Stasis Chamber. Uther then bound the Unclean One as the final seal to the Stasis Chamber, but the Greater Daemon gradually exerted its influence over the descendants in the Martyr, corrupting them into worshiping Nurgle. As the Inquisitor enters the Stasis Chamber, they come face to face with the Unclean One and battles the mighty warrior of Nurgle. The creature is completely destroyed when, after succumbing to its wounds, the Greater Daemon's spirit is completely consumed by the Alpha Pariah. As the Inquisitor attempts to escort the Alpha Pariah, the Machine Spirit of the Martyr intervenes, separating the Alpha Pariah and the Inquisitor and starting up the ship's Warp Drive. The Inquisitor teleports to their ship and can do nothing as they watch the Martyr make a warp jump. After it is gone, the Inquisitor vows to find the Martyr again the next time it reappears.

Prophecy (expansion)
The Martyr unexpectedly reappears in realspace, and the Inquisitor boards the ship again in search of the Alpha Pariah. He encounters Eldar from the Craftworld Tuathal, who are also there for the Alpha Pariah. They want to use her to cleanse their Chaos-infested Craftworld. The Inquisitor also encounters an Eldar Harlequin, who claims to be merely observing the drama. The Inquisitor rescues the Alpha Pariah and brings her to safety on board van Wynter's ship.

The Inquisitor also runs into a clone of Fabius Bile, a Chaos Space Marine and mad scientist. Bile claims he helped Uther Tiberius create the Alpha Pariah, but then Tiberius betrayed Bile; Bile claims the Alpha Pariah as rightfully his.

The Harlequin tells the Inquisitor of a very ancient prophecy concerning the Alpha Pariah. The Alpha Pariah's destiny is to close the Dark Nexus, which is a growing Warp rift in the Caligari Sector that could eventually become as large as the Eye of Terror. This would mean a new entry point by which Chaos warships could invade Imperium space. The prophecy mentions an artefact called the "Crown of Emptiness", created by a vanished xenos race known as the Fabricatus, which will allow the Alpha Pariah to control her powers. The Inquisitor tracks down the Crown of Emptiness to the ancient homeworld of the Fabricatus. After the Inquisitor gives the Crown to the Alpha Pariah, the Harlequin shows up and attempts to take the Alpha Pariah for herself. The Inquisitor slays the Harlequin.

In order to placate a fellow agent from the Ordo Hereticus, the Inquisitor agrees to hunt and assassinate the clone of Fabius Bile with the Alpha Pariah's help. After the Bile clone is slain, the Alpha Pariah pilots the Martyr into the Dark Nexus, which seals it.

Development and release 

The game was announced in 2015. It was released on June 5, 2018 for Microsoft Windows. The PlayStation 4 and Xbox One versions were released on August 23, 2018, and versions published by Nacon for PlayStation 5 and Xbox Series X/S are set to release in 2022.

Prophecy (expansion)
A stand-alone expansion for the game entitled Inquisitor - Prophecy was released on July 30, 2019 on PC. The expansion continues the original story of Martyr and adds a fourth class: The Tech-Adept.

Reception

References 

2018 video games
Action role-playing video games
Cooperative video games
Multiplayer and single-player video games
Open-world video games
PlayStation 4 games
Video games developed in Hungary
Windows games
Xbox One games
Warhammer 40,000 video games
NeocoreGames games